Stidzaeras evora is a moth in the family Erebidae. It was described by Herbert Druce in 1906. It is found in Peru.

References

Moths described in 1906
Phaegopterina
Moths of South America